Peter Julian Robin Morgan,  (10 April 1963) is a British screenwriter and playwright. He is the playwright behind The Audience and Frost/Nixon and the screenwriter of The Queen (2006), Frost/Nixon (2008), The Damned United (2009), and Rush (2013). Morgan wrote the television films The Deal (2003), Longford (2006), and The Special Relationship (2010). He serves as creator and showrunner of the Netflix series The Crown (2016–present).

In February 2017, Morgan was awarded a British Film Institute Fellowship (BFI).

Early life
Morgan was born in Wimbledon, London. His mother, Inga (née Bojcek), was a Catholic Pole who fled the Soviets, and his father, Arthur Morgenthau, was a German Jew who fled the Nazis, arriving in London in 1933. His father died when Morgan was nine years old. Morgan attended St Paul's School in London and boarding school at Downside School, Somerset, and gained a degree in Fine Art from the University of Leeds.

Career

1990s 
Morgan wrote television scripts during the 1990s, including an episode of Rik Mayall Presents... and the Comedy Premiere The Chest. He wrote the screenplay to the romantic comedy Martha, Meet Frank, Daniel and Laurence (1998).

2000s 
In 2002, Morgan had some success with the TV series The Jury (2002). In 2003, Morgan broke through with The Deal, a television drama about the power-sharing deal between Tony Blair and Gordon Brown that was struck in the Granita restaurant in London in 1994. Blair was portrayed by Michael Sheen, Sheen would return to playing Blair in The Queen and The Special Relationship.

In 2006, The Queen was released which showed how the death of Princess Diana impacted Prime Minister Tony Blair and the Royal Family. The film debuted at the Venice Film Festival where it received critical acclaim. The film received 6 Academy Award nominations including Best Picture. Morgan also received a nomination for Best Screenplay. Morgan received the Golden Globe Award for his screenplay from the Hollywood Foreign Press, and Helen Mirren won numerous awards for playing the title role including the Academy Award and the Golden Globe Award. 2006 also saw the release of The Last King of Scotland, the screenplay of which Morgan adapted with Jeremy Brock. In 2007 they jointly won a BAFTA Film Award for their work on the film. In May 2007, the 50th San Francisco International Film Festival honoured Morgan with the year's Kanbar Award for Excellence in Screenwriting.

Also in 2006, Morgan's first play, Frost/Nixon, was staged at the Donmar Warehouse theatre in London. Starring Michael Sheen as David Frost and Frank Langella as Richard Nixon, the play concerns the series of televised interviews that the disgraced former president granted Frost in 1977. These ended with his tacit admission of guilt regarding his role in the Watergate scandal. The play was directed by Michael Grandage and opened to enthusiastic reviews. The play transferred to Broadway in 2007 at the Bernard B. Jacobs Theatre where it ran from 21 April to 19 August. The play received 3 Tony Awards including one for Morgan for the Best Play. Langella won the Tony Award for Best Actor in a Play.

In 2008, the film adaptation of Frost/Nixon directed by Ron Howard was released, with Sheen and Langella playing the parts they had on stage. The film also starred Kevin Bacon, Rebecca Hall, Mathew Macfadyen, Toby Jones, Oliver Platt, and Sam Rockwell. The film debuted at the London Film Festival to critical acclaim. Roger Ebert gave the film 4 stars praising the writing and the performances of the leads saying, "Frank Langella and Michael Sheen do not attempt to mimic their characters, but to embody them". Despite praise from critics the film was a box office failure. The film received 5 Academy Award nominations including Best Adapted Screenplay for Morgan.

In July 2009, filming began on The Special Relationship, the third film of Morgan's "Blair trilogy". The film focuses on Blair's (again played by Michael Sheen) relationship with US president Bill Clinton, played by Dennis Quaid, between 1997 and 2000. Morgan was originally scheduled to direct the film (making his directorial debut) but pulled out a month before filming began. He was replaced by Richard Loncraine. The film debuted on HBO on 29 May 2010. The film received positive reviews with it receiving an 83% on Rotten Tomatoes with the consensus reading, "Well-cast and compellingly directed, The Special Relationship offers an intelligent look into the complex dynamic between two world leaders." The film received 5 Primetime Emmy Award nominations including, one for Morgan for Outstanding Writing for a Limited Series or Television Movie.

In 2008, Morgan was initially set to adapt the John le Carré's Tinker, Tailor, Soldier, Spy into a screenplay for Working Title Films but dropped out and served as the film's executive producer. In June 2009, it was announced that he would be the co-writer of Skyfall, the 23rd James Bond film. The Daily Telegraphs Mandrake diary reported in April 2010 that Morgan had quit the production after Sam Mendes was hired to direct, and that Patrick Marber would replace him. MGM dismissed the Telegraphs claims as speculation. In the end Morgan did not receive credit but rather it was Neal Purvis, Robert Wade, and John Logan who were credited as the film's screenwriters. He has since finished the script for Hereafter, a supernatural thriller "in the vein of The Sixth Sense". DreamWorks bought the screenplay on spec in March 2008. The development was later transferred to Warner Bros. and filming began in October 2009 under the direction of Clint Eastwood.

2010s 
In 2013, the film Rush was released. The film is a biographical sports film centred on the Hunt–Lauda rivalry between two Formula One drivers, the British James Hunt and the Austrian Niki Lauda during the 1976 Formula 1 motor-racing season. The film was directed by Ron Howard and written by Morgan and starred Chris Hemsworth, Daniel Brühl, and Olivia Wilde. The film was a financial and critical success. The film received four British Academy Film Award nominations including Outstanding British Film.

In 2013, Morgan's play The Audience debuted. The play revolves around the weekly meetings, called audiences, between Queen Elizabeth II and her  prime ministers over the time period of her reign. Dame Helen Mirren reprised her role as the Queen. The play premiered in the West End at the Gielgud Theatre where she eventually won the Olivier Award for Best Actress. A Broadway production opened in 2015 at the Gerald Schoenfeld Theatre which ran from 8 March to 15 June. Mirren also received the Tony Award for Best Actress in a Play.

Morgan's next feature film would be Bohemian Rhapsody (2018), a biopic about rock musician Freddie Mercury (portrayed by Rami Malek), the lead vocalist of the rock band Queen. Morgan has started writing the screenplay in 2010. The film was a massive box office success earning $903.7 million. The film however received a mixed critical response with critics praising Malek's central performances but criticising its editing, directing and pacing. Time Magazine film critic Stephanie Zacharek wrote, "In strict filmmaking terms, Bohemian Rhapsody is a bit of a mess. Some of its scenes connect awkwardly, and it hits every beat of disaster and triumphs squarely, like a gong." Despite its criticism, the film received various awards including four Academy Awards for Best Actor, Best Sound Editing, Best Sound Mixing, and Best Film Editing.

Morgan is the creator and writer of the Netflix fictional historical drama series The Crown, a biographical story about the reign of Queen Elizabeth II. The first season starred Claire Foy, Matt Smith, Vanessa Kirby, as Queen Elizabeth II, Prince Philip, and Princess Margaret. Jared Harris, and John Lithgow made supporting turns as King George VI, and Winston Churchill. The series has received widespread critical acclaim and received multiple Primetime Emmy Award nominations including a wins for Foy for Outstanding Lead Actress in a Drama Series, and Lithgow for Outstanding Supporting Actor in a Drama Series. The casts saw changes for Seasons 3 and 4 with Olivia Colman, Tobias Menzies and Helena Bonham Carter replacing, Foy, Smith, and Kirby. Morgan has received 3 Primetime Emmy Award nominations for writing the episodes, "Assassins", "Mystery Man", and "Aberfan".

2020s 
On 15 November 2020, the fourth series of The Crown was released to critical acclaim. According to the review-aggregator Rotten Tomatoes, the series holds 96% critics' consensus making it the highest rated series out of the four so far.

The season marks the introduction of Emma Corrin as Princess Diana and Morgan’s then girlfriend Gillian Anderson as British Prime Minister Margaret Thatcher, with Olivia Colman, Tobias Menzies, Helena Bonham Carter and Josh O'Connor reprising their roles as Queen Elizabeth II, Prince Philip, Princess Margaret and Prince Charles respectively.

The fourth season was awarded the AFI Television Program of the Year for the fourth time in a row, four Golden Globes, including Best TV Series, a Critics' Choice Award for Best Drama, and 10 BAFTA nominations including Best Drama. In September 2021, the fourth season won in all 7 Emmys Drama Categories and earned Netflix its first major win in the history of the streaming giant (Best Drama), with Morgan receiving the award for Outstanding Writing. Prior to that, he received a WGA Award for Best Drama and a PGA Award for Outstanding Producer of Episodic Television, Drama for the fourth season.

Season five of The Crown was released in November 2022 with season six proposed for 2023. Season six will be the last according to creator Peter Morgan. Imelda Staunton, Jonathan Pryce and Lesley Manville play the respective roles of Queen Elizabeth II, Prince Philip and Princess Margaret. Princess Diana is played by Elizabeth Debicki and Prince Charles is played by Dominic West.

In May 2022 it was announced that Patriots, Morgan's first play since The Audience will preview at the Almeida Theatre in London from 2nd July with an opening night on 12th and performances until 20th August. Set during the 1991 fall of the Soviet Union, Patriots will follow a generation of oligarchs as they try to seize control of a new world. Tom Hollander will lead the cast as businessman Boris Berezovsky. The cast also includes Will Keen as Vladimir Putin, Yolanda Kettle and Luke Thallon. Rupert Goold will direct. 

On 19th August 2022, after a successful run at the Almeida Theatre it was announced that Patriots will transfer to the Noel Coward Theatre in the West End from May 2023 for a 12-week run. Most of the original cast will reprise their role.

Personal life
Morgan was appointed Commander of the Order of the British Empire (CBE) in the 2016 New Year Honours for services to drama. In February 2017, he was awarded a British Film Institute Fellowship (BFI). In November 2019, Morgan was honoured by the American Film Institute with a tribute to his career at the AFI FEST 2019.
In July 2016, Morgan was presented with an Honorary Degree in Letters by the University of Leeds, his alma mater.

List of works

Film

Television

Theatre

Awards and nominations

References

External links
 
 Peter Morgan: Screenwriting Lecture part of the BAFTA Screenwriters on Screenwriting series.
 Profile in The Observer, September 2006.

1963 births
Alumni of the University of Leeds
Best Adapted Screenplay BAFTA Award winners
British dramatists and playwrights
British people of German-Jewish descent
British people of Polish descent
British male screenwriters
Living people
People educated at Downside School
People from Wimbledon, London
Writers from London
Best Screenplay Golden Globe winners
English male dramatists and playwrights
Commanders of the Order of the British Empire